The Fairfield County Courthouse in Danbury, Connecticut is a historic building that was designed by architect Warren R. Briggs, who also designed the Fairfield County Courthouse in Bridgeport

It is a contributing building in the Main Street Historic District.

The courthouse is still in use.

References

County courthouses in Connecticut
Buildings and structures in Danbury, Connecticut
Courthouses on the National Register of Historic Places in Connecticut
Historic district contributing properties in Connecticut
National Register of Historic Places in Fairfield County, Connecticut